Tazeh Kand-e Gol Chavan (also Romanized as Tāzeh Kand-e Gol Chavān; also known as Tāzeh Kand-e Chelān) is a village in Sarajuy-ye Sharqi Rural District, Saraju District, Maragheh County, East Azerbaijan Province, Iran. At the 2006 census, its population was 81, in 18 families.

References 

Towns and villages in Maragheh County